Events from the year 1843 in art.

Events
 August – Richard Dadd, taken to the country by his family to recover from a mental breakdown, commits patricide.
 The Hill & Adamson photographic partnership is formed in Edinburgh.
 John Ruskin's Modern Painters is published.

Works

 Berlin Peace Column
 Madison Square Fountain, New York City
 Théodore Chassériau – The Two Sisters
 Gustave Courbet – The Desperate Man (self-portrait; approximate date)
 Paul Delaroche – Charles de Rémusat
 William Etty – Musidora: The Bather 'At the Doubtful Breeze Alarmed' (first version)
 Julius Exner – Fra Kunstakademiets figursal ("From the Art Academy's Plaster Cast Collection")
 Sir George Hayter – Self-portrait
 Paul Falconer Poole – Solomon Eagle exhorting the People to Repentance during the Plague of 1665
 Hiram Powers – The Greek Slave
 J. M. W. Turner – Light and Colour (Goethe's Theory) – The Morning after the Deluge – Moses Writing the Book of Genesis
 Peter von Hess – The Battle of Borodino
 Franz Xaver Winterhalter
 Leonilla Bariatinskaia Princess of Sayn Wittgenstein Sayn (Getty Museum, Los Angeles)
 Queen Victoria (British Royal Collection)

Births
 March 3 – Aleksander Sochaczewski, Polish painter (died 1923)
 March 14 – Alexander Louis Leloir, French painter (died 1884)
 April 4 – William Henry Jackson, American explorer, photographer and painter (died 1942)
 April 8 – Howard Roberts, Philadelphia-based sculptor (died 1900)
 June 16 – Adolf Waldinger, painter from Osijek, Croatia (died 1904)
 July 19 – Lucy Madox Brown, English painter (died 1894)
 September 6 – Flaxman Charles John Spurrell, English archaeologist and photographer (died 1915)
 September 25 – Maria Spanò, Italian painter (date of death unknown)
 November 16 – Louise Jopling, English painter (died 1933)
 November 29 – Gertrude Jekyll, English garden designer (died 1932)
 date unknown
 Owon (Jang Seung-eop), Korean painter (died 1897)
 Giulio Salviati, Italian glassmaker and mosaicist (died 1898)

Deaths
 January 17 – Abraham Raimbach, English engraver (born 1776)
 January 20 – William Sawrey Gilpin, English watercolour painter (born 1762)
 Between February 21 and 28 – Alexander Carse, Scottish genre painter (born 1770)
 April 13 – Georgije Bakalović, Serbian painter (born 1786)
 July 9 – Washington Allston, painter, the "American Titian" (born 1779)
 July 12 – Josiah Wedgwood II, pottery owner, son of Josiah Wedgwood (born 1769)
 July 23 – Antonín Mánes, Czech painter (born 1784)
 August 12 – Jean-Pierre Cortot, French sculptor (born 1787)
 October 24 – Antoine Berjon, French painter and designer (born 1754)
 November 10 – John Trumbull, American painter (born 1756)
 November 27 – Vojtěch Benedikt Juhn, Czech painter and engraver (born 1779)
 date unknown
 Jean-Eugène-Charles Alberti, Dutch painter working primarily in Paris (born 1777)
 Hasegawa Settan, Japanese painter and wood sculptor during the late Edo period (born unknown)
 Alexander Varnek, Russian portrait painter (born 1782)

References

 
Years of the 19th century in art
1840s in art